Events from the year 1568 in art.

Events
A new, enlarged edition of Giorgio Vasari's Lives of the Most Excellent Painters, Sculptors, and Architects is published, including a new section on Leonardo da Vinci.

Works

Paintings
 Pieter Bruegel the Elder
 The Blind Leading the Blind
 The Peasant Wedding
 The Tower of Babel
 El Greco – The Last Supper
 Gian Paolo Lomazzo – Self-portrait

Births
January 20 - Ventura Salimbeni, Italian Mannerist painter and printmaker (died 1613)
March 16 - Juan Martínez Montañés, also known as el Dios de la Madera, Spanish sculptor (died 1649)
May 9 - Guglielmo Caccia called il Moncalvo, Italian painter who specialised in altar-pieces (died 1625)
date unknown
Alessandro Albini, Italian painter of the early Baroque period (died 1646)
Jan Brueghel the Elder, Flemish painter (died 1625)
Giovanni Battista Calandra, Italian mosaic artist (died c.1644)
Vincenzo Carducci, Italian painter (died 1638)
Andrés de la Concha, Spanish painter (died unknown)
Adam van Vianen, Dutch Golden Age medallist, engraver and silversmith (died 1627)
probable
Giuseppe Cesari, known as the Cavaliere d'Arpino, Italian painter (died 1640)

Deaths
June 5 - Willem Key, Flemish painter (born 1515)
date unknown
Pierre Bontemps, French sculptor (born 1505)
Battista del Moro, Italian painter of the Renaissance period active in his native Verona (born 1512)
Lodovico Dolce, Italian art theorist (born 1508/1510)
Lucas Gassel, Flemish painter (born 1490)
Vincenzo Pagani, Italian painter (born 1490)
Luis de Vargas, Spanish painter (born 1502)
Wang Guxiang, Chinese landscape painter during the Ming Dynasty (born 1501)
1568/1569 - Jacob Binck, German engraver and painter (born between 1490-1504)

Notes and references 

 
Years of the 16th century in art